Sackville Methodist/United Church was a 140-year-old historic landmark in the heart of Sackville, New Brunswick, Canada that was demolished in September 2015 in spite of opposition from many local residents and Heritage Canada's National Trust which placed the church on its top ten list of endangered places.

The church, built in 1875, was expanded in 1898 in the shape of a Greek cross designed by the noted architect H.H. Mott. Four-metre stained glass “rose” windows, created by J.C. Spence & Sons, adorned the four points of the cross. The church also featured a spire that rose 40 metres, a cast-iron bell weighing more than 500 kilograms, two large transepts, two balconies and a massive, 1928 organ built by Casavant Frères of Saint-Hyacinthe, Quebec with a total of 1,769 pipes. The building was an example of the Gothic Revival style which the town of Sackville describes in its guide to heritage architecture as a 19th-century "picturesque style characterized by applied delicate ornament."

The town installed a plaque in 1999 recognizing the Sackville United Church as a place where many generations of Methodists had worshipped after settlers from Yorkshire brought their religion to the area in the 1770s. (The church became known as Sackville United Church in 1925 when the Methodists joined with other Protestant denominations to form the United Church of Canada.) Historically, the church also had a close connection with nearby Mount Allison University. The university was founded in the 1840s as a Wesleyan academy for boys by the local merchant Charles Frederick Allison after his conversion to Methodism. Allison's body lies in the church cemetery. Generations of Mount Allison students attended the church until the university established its own chapel in the mid 1960s.

In 2012, as church attendance dwindled and maintenance costs continued to rise, the congregation decided to sell the church to a local developer and move to a smaller adjacent building that once housed Sackville's Town Hall. The decision touched off years of controversy. A local citizen's group offered $175,000 to save the building for use as a community centre, but was unable to buy it from its new owners, JN Lafford Realty Inc. Meantime, local politicians, including the town's mayor, engaged in conflict with volunteers on the municipal heritage board. When the board issued a demolition permit in March 2015, the citizen's group, known as SPLASH (Sackville People Leading Action to Save Heritage), appealed the decision to a provincial planning board. The appeal was unsuccessful; the church was demolished and a four-storey office/commercial/residential building was erected in its place.

References 

United Church of Canada churches in New Brunswick
Gothic Revival church buildings in Canada
Buildings and structures demolished in 2015
Demolished buildings and structures in Canada